Mark Roseman (born  1958) is an English historian of modern Europe with particular interest in The Holocaust. He received his B.A. at Christ's College, Cambridge and his PhD at the University of Warwick. As of 2007 he holds the Pat M. Glazer Chair of Jewish Studies at Indiana University (Bloomington).

Awards 
2001 Jewish Quarterly-Wingate Literary Prize, A Past in Hiding 
2002 Mark Lynton History Prize, A Past in Hiding
2003 Geschwister-Scholl-Preis, In einem unbewachten Augenblick. Eine Frau überlebt im Untergrund.

Books 
1992: Recasting the Ruhr 1945-1959: Manpower, Economic Recovery and Labour Relations. Oxford: Berg Publishers, .
2001: A Past in Hiding: Memory and Survival in Nazi Germany. New York: Metropolitan Books, . 
2002: The Villa, The Lake, The Meeting: Wannsee and the Final Solution. Harmondsworth: Penguin, . [Published in the US as The Wannsee Conference and the Final Solution: A Reconsideration. New York: Metropolitan Books, .]
2017: (ed. with Devin O. Pendas and Richard Wetzell) Beyond the Racial State: Rethinking Nazi Germany. Cambridge: Cambridge University Press, .
2019: Lives Reclaimed: A Story of Rescue and Resistance in Nazi Germany. New York: Metropolitan Books, .
2020: Überleben im Dritten Reich: Handlungsräume und Perspektiven von Juden und ihren Helfern. Göttingen: Wallstein, .

References 

Historians of the Holocaust
Alumni of Christ's College, Cambridge
Alumni of the University of Warwick
Indiana University faculty
1958 births
Living people
Historians from Indiana